APEC Chile 2004 was a series of political meetings held around Chile between the 21 member economies of the Asia-Pacific Economic Cooperation during 2004. Various meetings were held across Chile in 2004. Leaders from all the member countries met from 20 to 21 November 2004 in Santiago. The topic that Chile established was "A Community, Our Future".

The Chile 2004 theme and vision was "One Community, Our Future".

Ambassador Artaza claimed the Chile 2004 APEC would significantly portray the importance of social activities during the process of APEC's free trade and investment goals.

Attending country representatives

References

External links

2004 in Chile
History of Santiago, Chile
2004
Diplomatic conferences in Chile
21st-century diplomatic conferences (Asia-Pacific)
2004 in international relations
2004 conferences
November 2004 events in South America